The small cardiac vein, also known as the right coronary vein, is a coronary vein that drains parts of the right atrium and right ventricle of the heart. Despite its size, it is one of the major drainage vessels for the heart.

Anatomy

Course 
The small cardiac vein runs in the coronary sulcus between the right atrium and right ventricle, and opens into the right extremity of the coronary sinus.

Territory 
The small cardiac vein receives blood from the posterior portion of the right atrium and ventricle.

Variation 
The small cardiac vein may empty into the coronary sinus, right atrium, or middle cardiac vein. It may be absent.

References

External links
  - "Anterior view of the heart."

Veins of the torso